is a Japanese politician of Your Party, formerly of the Liberal Democratic Party, a member of the House of Councillors, formerly a member of the House of Representatives in the Diet (national legislature). A native of Hokuto, Yamanashi, and graduate of the University of Tokyo, he joined the National Police Agency in 1976, receiving a master's degree in jurisprudence from the University of Angers in France while in the agency. He was elected to the House of Representatives for the first time in the 2005 Japanese general election.

He ran in House of Councillors election in 2010 as a proportional candidate of Your Party and won.

References

External links 
  

1953 births
Living people
People from Tokyo
Politicians from Yamanashi Prefecture
University of Tokyo alumni
University of Angers alumni
Koizumi Children
Your Party politicians
Members of the House of Representatives (Japan)
Members of the House of Councillors (Japan)
Liberal Democratic Party (Japan) politicians
Japanese police officers
Unity Party (Japan) politicians